Moritz Herman Flohr ( August 15, 1911 – June 2, 1994) was an American Major League Baseball pitcher. Nicknamed "Dutch", he played for the Philadelphia Athletics during the  season.

References

Major League Baseball pitchers
Philadelphia Athletics players
Baseball players from New York (state)
1911 births
1994 deaths
Duke Blue Devils baseball players